This is a timeline of the 21st century.

2001–2009

2001
 January 15: Wikipedia is launched.
 January 20: 
 President Joseph Estrada of the Philippines is ousted.
 George W. Bush is inaugurated as President of the United States.
 January 26: An earthquake strikes Gujarat, India, on Republic Day, resulting in more than 20,000 deaths.
 May 27: Dos Palmas kidnappings: Twenty tourists are abducted by the Abu Sayyaf Group terrorists from a popular island resort in the Philippines.
 June 1: Eleven members of the royal family of Nepal, including the king and queen, are killed by Crown Prince Dipendra, who wounds himself and dies three days later.
 September 11: September 11 attacks: Nineteen Al-Qaeda terrorists hijack four planes, crashing two into the twin towers of the World Trade Center in New York City, the third plane into the Pentagon in Washington, DC, while the fourth plane is downed on the outskirts of Stonycreek Township, Pennsylvania. 2,996 people, including 2,977 victims and 19 hijackers, die in the attacks.
 October 7 – December 17: The United States invades Afghanistan and topples the Taliban regime, resulting in a long-term war.
 October 23: Steve Jobs introduces the first iPod.
 November 12: Crash of American Airlines Flight 587.
 December 3: Enron files for Chapter 11 bankruptcy after a series of scandals.
 December 11: China becomes a member of the World Trade Organization.
 December 19: The Lord of the Rings: The Fellowship of the Ring is released.
 December 19 – 20: During an economic crisis in Argentina, the government effectively freezes all bank accounts for twelve months which leads to riots and President de la Rúa's resignation from office. There are five "presidents" in less than a month.
 The al-Aqsa Intifada continues.
 Dean Kamen unveils Segway.
 The media magnate Silvio Berlusconi is elected Prime Minister of Italy.

2002
 January 1: The Euro enters circulation.
 February 3: Tom Brady leads the New England Patriots to win their first Super Bowl; during a nearly two decade span, they would appear in ten, winning seven.
 February 6: Golden Jubilee of Elizabeth II.
 February 8: The Algerian Civil War ends.
 February 27 – March 1: Riots and mass killings in the Indian state of Gujarat leave 1,044 dead.
 March 14: SpaceX is founded by Elon Musk.
 May 20: East Timor gains independence.
 June 11: The first episode of American Idol airs on Fox.
 July 1: The International Criminal Court is established.
 July 9: The African Union is founded.
 September 19: The First Ivorian Civil War begins.
 September 23: Mozilla Firefox is released.
 October 2 – 23: Beltway sniper attacks.
 October 12: The 2002 Bali bombings killed 202 people and injured 209 more.
 October 23 – 26: Chechen rebels seize a theater in Moscow. Amid this siege, around 200 people died.
 November 16: The 2002-2004 SARS outbreak began in Guangdong.
 December 18: The Lord of the Rings: The Two Towers is released.
 Switzerland joins the United Nations as the 190th member.
 Steve Fossett becomes the first person to fly solo nonstop around the world.
 2001–2002 India–Pakistan standoff ends.
 Israel starts Operation Defensive Shield in the West Bank in response to a wave of Palestinian suicide attacks.
 Construction of the Israeli West Bank barrier begins.
 America demands Iraq allow unfettered access to weapons inspectors.
 The Guantanamo Bay detention camp is established.
 Hu Jintao is elected as General Secretary of the Chinese Communist Party.
 Brazil wins the 2002 FIFA World Cup.

2003
 February 1: Space Shuttle Columbia disintegrates upon reentry, killing all 7 astronauts on board.
 February 20: The Station nightclub fire.
 March 19: The United States invades Iraq and ousts Saddam Hussein, triggering worldwide protests and an 8 year war.
 August 5: 2003 Marriott Hotel bombing kills 12 people.
 August 27 – 29: The first six-party talks, involving South and North Korea, the United States, China, Japan and Russia.
 November 3 – 23: The Rose Revolution occurs in Georgia.
 November 17: Arnold Schwarzenegger becomes Governor of California.
 December 17: The Lord of the Rings: The Return of the King is released.
 The War in Darfur begins.
 The Human Genome Project is completed.
 The Second Congo War ends with more than 5 million dead.
 The Second Liberian Civil War ends.
 The last Volkswagen Beetle is made in Mexico, after 65 years in production.
 Final flight of the SST (Supersonic Transport) Concorde.

2004
 January 28: The first episode of Winx Club airs on Nickelodeon.
 February 4: Facebook is formed by Mark Zuckerberg, Andrew McCollum, Eduardo Saverin, Dustin Moskovitz, and Chris Hughes.
 February 27: The 2004 SuperFerry 14 bombing kills 116 people.
 March 11: Madrid train bombings killed 193 people and injured around 2,000, Europe's deadliest attack since Pan Am Flight 103.
 September 1 – 3: On September 1st (first school day in Russia), a group of chechen terrorists held students, parents and teachers hostage in Beslan school, in North Ossetia–Alania. During three days under attack, 334 people died.
 October 23 – 27: Boston Red Sox wins the World Series for the first time since 1918, ending the Curse of the Bambino.
 November 11: President of the Palestinian National Authority Yasser Arafat dies.
 November 7 – December 23: The Second Battle of Fallujah occurs. It is the deadliest American battle since Vietnam, killing 95 troops.
 December 8: Union of South American Nations formed.
 December 12: Sony Computer Entertainment launches the PlayStation Portable.
 December 26: Boxing Day Tsunami occurs in Indian Ocean, leading to the deaths of 230,000.
 NATO and the European Union incorporates most of the former Eastern Bloc.
 Spirit and Opportunity land on Mars. 
 Orange Revolution in Ukraine.
 First surface images of Saturn's moon Titan.
 Death and state funeral of Ronald Reagan.

2005
 January 9: Second Sudanese Civil War ends.
 February 14: 
 2005 Valentine's Day bombings.
 YouTube is founded by Jawed Karim, Chad Hurley and Steve Chen.
 February 14 – April 27: Cedar Revolution in Lebanon triggered by the assassination of Rafic Hariri.
 February 16: The Kyoto Protocol comes into effect.
 March 22 – April 11: Tulip Revolution in Kyrgyzstan.
 April 2 – 19: Pope John Paul II dies, Benedict XVI becomes Pope.
 April 9: Wedding of Prince Charles and Camilla Parker Bowles.
 June 13: Michael Jackson was acquitted on all charges related to the alleged sexual abuse of a 13-year-old boy.
 June 23: Reddit is founded by Steve Huffman, Aaron Swartz and Alexis Ohanian.
 July 7: 7/7 attacks on London Underground.
 July 26 – 27: Floods in Maharashtra, India over 1000 peoples died.
 July 28: The Provisional Irish Republican Army ends its military campaign in Northern Ireland.
 July 29: Michael E. Brown confirms Eris.
 August 3: Mahmoud Ahmadinejad becomes President of Iran.
 August 18: Peace Mission 2005, the first joint China–Russia military exercise, begins its eight-day training on the Shandong Peninsula.
 August 29 – 31: Hurricane Katrina kills 1,836 people in the Gulf of Mexico.
 September 30: Controversial drawings of Muhammad are printed in the Danish newspaper Jyllands-Posten, sparking outrage and violent riots by Muslims around the world.
 October 8: 80,000 were killed in an earthquake in Kashmir, Pakistan and Afghanistan.
 November 22: Angela Merkel becomes Germany's first female Chancellor.
 November 30: Surgeons in France carry out the first human face transplant with Isabelle Dinoire becoming the first person to undergo it.
 Israel withdraws from Gaza.
 Second Sudanese Civil War ends.

2006
 January 16: Ellen Johnson Sirleaf becomes President of Liberia, and thus Africa's first elected female head of state.
 January 25: Hamas wins the 2006 Palestinian legislative election.
 February 17: 2006 Southern Leyte mudslide.
 February 22: 2006 al-Askari mosque bombing turns the escalation of sectarian violence in Iraq into a full-scale war (the Iraqi Civil War of 2006-2008).
 March 21: Twitter is launched.
 April 23: Spotify is launched.
 May 5: The first episode of Mickey Mouse Clubhouse airs on Disney Channel.
 May 21 – June 3: Independence of Montenegro.
 July 11: Mumbai bombings.
 August 11: Guimaras oil spill.
 September 1: Roblox was released by David Baszucki.
 September 19: A coup d'état in Thailand overthrows the government of Prime Minister Thaksin Shinawatra.
 October 9 – November 13: Google acquires YouTube for US$1.65 billion.
 October 18: Murder of Altantuya Shaaribuu: The Mongolian model was murdered in Malaysia.
 November 1: Former Russian security agent Alexander Litvinenko dies from poisoning in the UK.
 November 21: Comprehensive Peace Accord ends the Nepalese Civil War.
 December 30: Execution of Saddam Hussein by hanging.
 2006 Lebanon War.
 Mexican Drug War begins.
 Somalia War of 2006 begins.
 The International Astronomical Union creates the first formal definition of a planet, and excludes Pluto from the list. 
 Nintendo launches the Wii.
 The Baiji, the Yangtze river dolphin, becomes functionally extinct.
 Italy wins 2006 FIFA World Cup.
 Israeli soldier Gilad Shalit was abducted by Hamas.
 Death and state funeral of Gerald Ford.

2007
 January 4: Nancy Pelosi becomes the first female Speaker of the United States House of Representatives.
 January 9: Introduction of the iPhone.
 January 25: A civil war escalated in the Gaza Strip throughout June, which resulted in Hamas eventually driving most Fatah-loyal forces from the Strip. In reaction, Palestinian president Mahmoud Abbas dismissed Hamas prime minister Ismail Haniyeh and dissolved the Hamas-ruled parliament. 
 March 4: First Ivorian Civil War ends.
 April 16: Virginia Tech shooting.
 May 3: Disappearance of Madeleine McCann.
 June 22 – 24: Chris Benoit double-murder and suicide.
 June 27: Gordon Brown becomes Prime Minister of the United Kingdom.
 August 15: Anti-government protests in Myanmar suppressed by ruling junta.
 November 29: Manila Peninsula siege.
 December 13: 27 EU member states sign the Treaty of Lisbon, with the treaty coming into effect on December 1, 2009.
 December 27: Assassination of Benazir Bhutto.
 Spike in food prices and subprime crisis help trigger global recession.
 First Ivorian Civil War ends.
 Crisis follows the Kenyan presidential election of 2007, leading to the formation of a coalition government.

2008

 May 2:
 Cyclone Nargis kills 133,000 in Myanmar.
 Iron Man is released in cinemas, which jump-starts the Marvel Cinematic Universe; the MCU becomes the highest-grossing film franchise of all time.
 May 7: Dmitry Medvedev becomes President of Russia.
 May 28: The 1st Nepalese Constituent Assembly declares Nepal a republic, ending its monarchy.
 June 20 – 21: Sinking of MV Princess of the Stars.
 November 4: Barack Obama is elected to become the first black President of the United States.
 November 26 – 29: 2008 Mumbai attacks.
 Google Chrome is released.
 The Gaza War begins.
 2008 South Ossetia war.
 Kosovo declares independence, though it is not recognised by the United Nations.
 Iraqi forces crack down on Muqtada al Sadr's Mahdi forces in Basra and Sadr City.
 The Large Hadron Collider is completed as the world's largest and most powerful particle collider.
 Tesla Roadster launched, the first mass production lithium-ion battery electric car.
 Stock markets plunge around the world, signaling the start of the Great Recession.

2009
 January 3: The cryptocurrency Bitcoin is launched.
 January 15: US Airways Flight 1549 ditches in the Hudson River in an accident that becomes known as the "Miracle on the Hudson", as all 155 people on board are rescued.
 January 20: Barack Obama is inaugurated as President of the United States, the first African-American to hold the office.
 June 16: Formation of BRICS economic bloc.
 June 19: Zynga release FarmVille.
 June 25: Death of Michael Jackson.
 August 1: Former Philippine president Corazon Aquino dies of colon cancer.
 September 26: Typhoon Ketsana kills 789 people in the Philippines.
 November 23: 58 people are abducted and killed in the Philippine province of Maguindanao.
 December 1: Treaty of Lisbon.
 December 18: Avatar is released in cinemas and becomes the highest-grossing film of all time. 
 The Gaza War ends while Gaza blockade continues.
 The Sri Lankan Civil War ends.
 Election protests begin in Iran.
 The Second Chechen War ends.
 Boko Haram rebellion begins in Nigeria.
 2009 swine flu pandemic began in North America.

2010s

2010
 January 12: A 7.0 magnitude earthquake in Haiti kills 230,000.
 February 18: 2010 Nigerien coup d'état.
 March 29: 2010 Moscow Metro bombings.
 April 10: The President of Poland, Lech Kaczyński, is among 96 killed when their airplane crashes in Smolensk.
 April 20: The largest oil spill in US history occurs in the Gulf of Mexico.
 May 10: Benigno Aquino III is elected as the 15th President of the Philippines.
 May 11: After the 2010 United Kingdom general election, David Cameron becomes Prime Minister of the United Kingdom.
 May 31: Gaza flotilla raid.
 June 11 – July 11: The FIFA World Cup is held in Africa for the first time.
 July 22 – August 10: 2010 Colombia–Venezuela diplomatic crisis.
 August 23: Manila hostage crisis.
 November 23: North Korea shells the island of Yeonpyeong.
 A military crackdown occurs in Thailand.
 The threat of Greece defaulting on its debts triggers the European sovereign debt crisis and Republic of Ireland's financial crisis.
 Burmese political prisoner Aung San Suu Kyi is released from house arrest.
 Arab Spring starts.
 Kyrgyz Revolution of 2010.
 The Burj Khalifa in Dubai becomes the tallest structure in the world, standing at 829.8 m (2,722 ft).
 Dilma Rousseff is elected as the first female president of Brazil.
 The iPad is introduced.
 Instagram is launched.
 2010 eruptions of Eyjafjallajökull.
 Julia Gillard is elected first woman Prime Minister of Australia.

2011
 February 22: Christchurch earthquake kills 185 and injures 2,000.
 March 11: A 9.0 earthquake in Japan triggers a tsunami and the meltdown of the Fukushima Nuclear Power Plant.
 April 29: Wedding of Prince William and Catherine Middleton.
 May 2: Osama bin Laden is shot dead by United States Navy SEALs in Pakistan.
 July 5: Casey Anthony is found not guilty of first degree murder and manslaughter in the death of her daughter Caylee in 2008, but found guilty of four misdemeanor counts of giving false information to police.
 July 9: Independence of South Sudan.
 July 22: 2011 Norway attacks.
 August 6 – 11: Riots flare across England.
 October 20: Muammar Gaddafi is captured and killed during the Battle of Sirte.
 November 8: Activision release Call of Duty: Modern Warfare 3.
 November 18: Mojang released Minecraft.
 World population reaches 7 billion.
 Snapchat launched.
 Arab Spring: revolutions in Tunisia, Egypt and Libya follow, as well as uprisings in Yemen and Bahrain, and protests in several other Arab countries.
 Syrian civil war begins.
 Second Ivorian Civil War.
 Occupy movement inspires worldwide protests.
 News International phone hacking scandal.
 Death and state funeral of Kim Jong-il.
 The Danyang–Kunshan Grand Bridge, the world's longest, opens in China.
 Second Ivorian Civil War ends with the arrest of former president Laurent Gbagbo.
 Iraq War ends.
 Bombings occur in Russia and Somalia.
 A Twitter post insults the most left groups in the United States as extremist and labels them as "Social Justice Warriors". The extremist on the right group, primarily the Neo-Nazis grow further apart and the event has since divided the country between two opposing hate groups.
 Floods in Pakistan, Thailand and the Philippines kill roughly 2,500 people.
 Space Shuttle program is officially ended.
 NASA launches spacecraft to visit Jupiter and Mars.
 Amazon Rainforest and River, Hạ Long Bay, Jeju Island, Iguazú Falls, Puerto Princesa Underground River, Komodo Island and Table Mountain were named as the world's New7Wonders of Nature.

2012
 January 13: Costa Concordia disaster.
 January 16 – May 29: Impeachment of Renato Corona.
 February 6: The first episode of It's Showtime airs on ABS-CBN.
 February 26: Killing of Trayvon Martin: The 17-year-old African-American high school student was killed in Sanford, Florida.
 April 12: King release Candy Crush Saga.
 May 7: Vladimir Putin is elected president of Russia for the third time.
 July 15: Gangnam Style, a K-pop song by South Korean rapper Psy is released and becomes the worldwide phenomenon due to recognition of Guinness World Records as the most "liked" video on YouTube at the time. 
 July 20: 2012 Aurora, Colorado shooting.
 September 11 – 12: 2012 Benghazi attack leads to the death of US ambassador J. Christopher Stevens.
 October 9: Assassination attempt on Pakistani schoolgirl Malala Yousafzai.
 October 14: 
 Skydiver Felix Baumgartner becomes the first person to break the sound barrier without a vehicle.
 FIGat7th, reopens the newly constructed center which was happened in the fall of 2012.
 October 22 – November 22: Hurricane Sandy causes $70 billion in damage and kills 233 people.
 November 6: Barack Obama wins second term as President of the United States, defeating former Massachusetts Governor Mitt Romney.
 November 15: Xi Jinping is elected as General Secretary of the Chinese Communist Party.
 November 26 – December 8: UN Climate Change Conference agrees to extend the Kyoto Protocol until 2020.
 December 4 – 9: Typhoon Bopha kills over 1,600 in the Philippines.
 December 14: Sandy Hook Elementary School shooting.
 The Higgs boson is discovered.
 Conflict begins in the Central African Republic.
 Israel launches Operation Pillar of Defense against the Palestinian-governed Gaza Strip.
 The US rover, Curiosity, takes a selfie on Mars and finds evidence of an ancient streambed of water on the Red Planet.
 Diamond Jubilee of Elizabeth II.
 The 2012 Summer Olympics was hosted in London, United Kingdom.
 Park Geun-hye is elected President of South Korea.
 Shenouda III, Pope of the Coptic Orthodox Church of Alexandria, departs; Tawadros II succeeds him.
 Yemeni President Ali Abdullah Saleh steps down.
 Northern Mali conflict, the MNLA declares Azawad an independent state.

2013
 February 15: An undiscovered meteor strikes the Chelyabinsk oblast in Russia, with an airburst injuring thousands and damaging many buildings.
 February 28 – March 13: Pope Benedict XVI resigns, the first Pope to do since 1415, and Pope Francis is elected, becoming the first Pope from Latin America.
 March 5: Death and state funeral of Hugo Chavez.
 April 24: The Rana Plaza collapses in Bangladesh.
 May 22: British Army soldier Fusilier Lee Rigby of the Royal Regiment of Fusiliers is murdered in Woolwich, southeast London by Islamic terrorists Michael Adebolajo and Michael Adebowale.
 July 3: President of Egypt Mohamed Morsi is deposed by the military in a coup d'état.
 July 22: Birth of Prince George of Wales.
 August 21: A chemical attack in Ghouta, Syria is blamed on President Bashar al-Assad.
 September 9 – 28: Zamboanga City crisis.
 September 17: Rockstar Games release Grand Theft Auto V.
 October 15: A 7.2 magnitude earthquake in Bohol, kills 222.
 November 8: Typhoon Haiyan kills nearly 6,150 people in Vietnam and the Philippines.
 November 21: The Euromaidan protest begins in Ukraine.
 December 5: Death and state funeral of Nelson Mandela.
 The French military intervenes in the Northern Mali conflict.
 Terrorist attacks occur in Boston and Nairobi.
 Edward Snowden releases classified documents concerning mass surveillance by the NSA.
 Croatia becomes a member of the European Union.
 Conflict begins in South Sudan.
 Uruguay becomes the first country to fully legalize cannabis.
 End of 2012–2013 Cypriot financial crisis.
 Kiss nightclub fire.
 2013 Alberta floods.
 2013 Lahad Datu standoff.
 Guang Da Xing No. 28 incident.
 Death and funeral of Margaret Thatcher.

2014
 February: Euromaidan protest in Ukraine sparks a revolution and the overthrow of Viktor Yanukovych, leading to Russia's annexation of Crimea and the War in Donbas.
 March 8: Malaysia Airlines Flight 370 disappears from radar while en route to Beijing from Kuala Lumpur. There were 239 people on board.
 April 16: The MV Sewol sinks, killing 304 of 476 passengers, 250 of which were students at Danwon High School.
 May 22: A coup d'état in Thailand overthrows the caretaker government.
 June 19: King Juan Carlos I of Spain abdicates; his son becomes King Felipe VI.
 August 9: The shooting of African-American teenager Michael Brown by police leads to violent unrest in Ferguson, Missouri.
 September 4: Gilas Pilipinas claims their first win in the FIBA World Cup in four decades against Senegal in overtime, 81–79.
 November 12: The Rosetta spacecraft's Philae probe becomes the first to successfully land on a comet.
 December 16: Tehrik-i-Taliban Pakistan kill over 130 students in Pakistan.
 The worst Ebola epidemic in recorded history occurs in West Africa, infecting nearly 30,000 people and resulting in the deaths of 11,000+.
 The Yemeni Civil War begins after the Houthi takeover in Yemen.
 Uyghur genocide in Xinjiang begins.
 Indonesia AirAsia Flight 8501 crashes into the Java Sea, while Malaysia Airlines Flight 17 is shot down over Ukraine and Air Algérie Flight 5017 is downed in Mali.
 Israel launches an assault on the Gaza Strip in response to tit-for-tat murder-kidnappings, leading to the deaths of 71 Israelis and 2,100 Palestinians.
 ISIS begins its offensive in northern Iraq, leading to intervention in Iraq and Syria by a US-led coalition.
 Second Libyan Civil War begins.
 Narendra Modi is elected as the Prime Minister of India.
 Joko Widodo is elected President of Indonesia.
 Yeonmi Park delivers an emotional speech at the 2014 One Young World Summit.
 Doha, Durban, Havana, Kuala Lumpur, La Paz and Vigan were chosen as the world's New7Wonders Cities.

2015
 January 1: Five former Soviet Union countries form the Eurasian Economic Union.
 January 3 – 7: Boko Haram perpetrates a massacre of over 2,000 people in Baga, Nigeria, and allies itself with ISIL.
 January 15 – 19: Pope Francis's visit to the Philippines.
 January 25: Mamasapano clash.
 April 2: Al-Shabaab perpetrates a mass shooting in Kenya, killing 148.
 April 25 – May 3: The death of an African-American man, Freddie Gray by police leads to violent unrest in Baltimore, Maryland.
 May 3: Floyd Mayweather Jr. vs. Manny Pacquiao.
 May 13: Kentex slipper factory fire.
 July 14: Joint Comprehensive Plan of Action agreement reached, setting limits to Iran's nuclear program in exchange for sanctions relief.
 September 28: The first episode of FPJ's Ang Probinsyano airs on ABS-CBN.
 September 30: Russia begins air strikes against ISIL and anti-government forces in Syria
 November 30 – December 12: 195 nations agree to lower carbon emissions by negotiating the Paris agreement.
 December 20: Pia Alonzo Wurtzbach of the Philippines is crowned Miss Universe 2015.
 A series of terrorist attacks occur in Paris.
 A series of earthquakes in the Himalayas kills over 10,000 people.
 The heads of China and Taiwan meet for the first time, while the United States and Cuba reestablish full diplomatic relations.
 Liquid water is found on Mars.
 First close-up images of Ceres and Pluto.
 China announces the end of One-child policy after 35 years.
 European migrant crisis.
 The Supreme Court of the United States determines that same-sex couples have a constitutional right to marry.
 Homo naledi, a species of early human, is discovered in Africa.
 Crash of Germanwings Flight 9525.
 Volkswagen emissions scandal.
 Charleston church shooting.
 Assassination of Boris Nemtsov.
 2015 FIFA corruption case.

2016
 January 8: El Chapo is recaptured following his escape from a high-security prison in Mexico.
 February 11: Detection of gravitational waves by LIGO confirmed.
 March 20: Barack Obama becomes the first U.S. president to visit Cuba since Calvin Coolidge in 1928.
 April 3: Panama Papers, a leak of legal documents, reveals information of 214,888 offshore companies.
 April 13: The Golden State Warriors set the NBA single-season victory mark by notching their 73rd win in the season's final game. The Warriors finished the regular-season with a 73–9 record.
 May 9: Rodrigo Duterte becomes President of the Philippines, and initiates a controversial drug war.
 June 1: The Gotthard Base Tunnel, the world's longest and deepest railway tunnel, is completed.
 June 12: A shooter kills 49 people at a gay nightclub in Orlando, Florida.
 June 23 – July 13: The people of the United Kingdom vote to leave the European Union; David Cameron resigns as a result, and Theresa May succeeds him as the second female Prime Minister of the UK.
 July 4: Juno enters orbit into Jupiter.
 July 12: Philippines wins the arbitration case against China.
 September 4: Mother Teresa is officially canonized by Pope Francis.
 October 25 – November 2: Chicago Cubs wins the World Series for the first time since 1908, ending the Curse of the Billy Goat.
 November 4: The Paris Agreement, signed by 195 nations to fight global warming, formally goes into effect.
 November 8: Donald Trump wins the 2016 presidential election, in an upset against Hillary Clinton, the first female to be nominated for a major party.
 November 18: Former Philippine president Ferdinand Marcos is buried at the Libingan ng mga Bayani with rites closed to the general public that resulted in nationwide protests by groups, sectors, and personalities opposing the burial of Marcos at the state cemetery.
 The United Nations lifts sanctions from Iran in recognition of the dismantling of its nuclear program.
 Pope Francis and Patriarch Kirill sign the Ecumenical Declaration.
 ISIL claims responsibility for a series of bombings in Brussels, a massacre at Istanbul's Atatürk Airport and car ramming attacks in Nice.
 Augmented-reality game, Pokémon Go, is released, breaking records in revenue, and becoming the best-selling mobile game.
 The Colombian government signs a peace deal with FARC to end the Colombian conflict, despite narrowly losing a referendum.
 The government of Turkey begins a series of purges in reaction to a failed coup d'état attempt.
 The 2016 Summer Olympics take place in Rio de Janeiro, Brazil.
 United States troops withdraw from Afghanistan after 15 years.
 The President of Brazil, Dilma Rousseff, is impeached.
 Vajiralongkorn becomes King of Thailand.
 Andrei Karlov, the Russian Ambassador to Turkey, is assassinated at an art exhibition in Ankara.
 Tsai Ing-wen is elected as the first female President of Taiwan.
 2016 attack on the Saudi diplomatic missions in Iran.
 2016 Russian Defence Ministry Tupolev Tu-154 crash.
 Radovan Karadžić found guilty of 10 of 11 counts of war crimes, genocide and crimes against humanity and is sentenced to 40 years in prison.
 Dhaka attack kills 29 people.
 A third set of locks in the Panama Canal opens for commercial traffic.
 2016 Southern Taiwan earthquake.
 An outbreak of the Zika virus is linked to a cluster of cases of microcephaly.
 Death and state funeral of Fidel Castro.
 TikTok is launched.

2017
 January 20: Donald Trump is inaugurated as President of the United States.
 January 21: Millions of people participated in the Women's March, as a response to the inauguration of Donald Trump.
 February 13: Kim Jong-nam, the half-brother of Kim Jong-Un, is assassinated in Kuala Lumpur.
 May 13: Pope Francis canonizes Jacinta and Francisco Marto, two of the three Fátima children who reported seeing the Virgin Mary in the spring and summer of 1917.
 May 22: A terrorist bombing attack at an Ariana Grande concert in Manchester, England kills 22 people and injures over 140.
 May 23: Martial law declared in Mindanao following clashes between Philippine government forces and the Maute group in Marawi.
 June 2: 36 people are killed in an attack in Resorts World Manila.
 July 4: Russia and China urge North Korea to halt its missile and nuclear programs after it successfully tested its first intercontinental ballistic missile.
 August 11 – 12: The city of Charlottesville is the site of a far-right rally protesting the removal of Confederate statues throughout the US. During the event, a white supremacist rams his car into a crowd of counter-protesters, injuring 19 and killing one.
 August 21: A solar eclipse passes throughout the contiguous United States for the first time since 1918.
 September: Two earthquakes strike Mexico on September 8 and September 19, killing over 400 people.
 October 1: 60 people are killed in a mass shooting at a music festival in Las Vegas.
 October 14: A bombing in Mogadishu, Somalia on October 14, kills 587 people and injures 316. It is one of the deadliest terrorist attacks in modern history.
 October 16 – 17: Philippine forces liberates Marawi City after the deaths of Isnilon Hapilon and Omar Maute.
 October 28: 'Oumuamua, the first known interstellar object, is identified.
 November 5: 26 people are killed in a church in Sutherland Springs, Texas.
 Tensions between North Korea and the UN escalate as the country tests a hydrogen bomb and conducts a series of ballistic missile tests. The UN responds with a wave of export sanctions.
 Islamic State of Iraq and the Levant (ISIL) launch simultaneous attacks in Tehran, destroy the Great Mosque of al-Nuri in Mosul Iraq, and kill 311 in Egypt, but are declared defeated in Iraq by the end of the year.
 2017–18 North Korea crisis begins as North Korea conducts a series of missile and nuclear tests that demonstrate its ability to launch ballistic missiles beyond its immediate region. 
 A military operation targeting Rohingya Muslims in Myanmar is declared ethnic cleansing by the UNHCR.
 This year's Atlantic Hurricane season features Hurricane Harvey, which kills 107 and becomes the costliest hurricane in US history, as well as Hurricane Irma, killing 134, and Hurricane Maria, killing 3,059.
 Robert Mugabe is ousted in a coup d'état, while Ratko Mladić is declared guilty of genocide.
 Allegations of sexual abuse against film producer Harvey Weinstein lead to a wave of similar accusations from within Hollywood and other areas of primarily the English-speaking world.
 Nintendo launches the Nintendo Switch.
 Grenfell Tower fire in London kills 72 and injures 70.
 The President of South Korea, Park Geun-hye, is impeached, while Moon Jae-in is elected president.
 Emmanuel Macron becomes President of France after defeating far-right candidate Marine Le Pen.

2018
 January 12: The restored Triton Fountain is inaugurated.
 March 24: March for Our Lives occurs in 900 locations worldwide in response to the 14 February Parkland shooting.
 April 26: Boracay closes to tourists for six months as part of the government's efforts to rehabilitate and redevelop the island.
 May 11: Maria Lourdes Sereno was ousted from her post as Chief Justice of the Supreme Court of the Philippines.
 June 12: The first summit between the US and North Korea and the first ever crossing of the Korean Demilitarized Zone by a North Korean leader occur.
 June 23 – July 10: Twelve boys and their football coach are successfully rescued from the flooded Tham Luang Nang Non cave in Thailand.
 June 24: Saudi Arabia allows women to drive.
 October 2: Exiled Washington Post journalist Jamal Khashoggi is assassinated inside the Saudi consulate in Istanbul, triggering a diplomatic crisis for Saudi Arabia.
 November 25: Kerch Strait incident triggers martial law in Ukraine.
 December 11: Return of the Balangiga bells in the Philippines after 117 years.
 December 17: Catriona Gray of the Philippines is crowned Miss Universe 2018.
 Turkey invades northern Syria, while 70 die in a chemical attack, triggering a missile strike against Bashar al-Assad.
 Pakatan Harapan becomes the first opposition party to assume power in Malaysia since independence.
 Twenty-year Eritrean–Ethiopian border conflict formally ends.
 Yellow vests movement becomes France's largest sustained period of civil unrest since 1968.
 The Sunda strait tsunami kills 426 and injures 14,000 and the 2018 Sulawesi earthquake and tsunami kills 4,340 and injures 10,700.
 Macedonia and Greece reach a historic agreement in the Macedonia naming dispute, in which the former is renamed in 2019 to the 'Republic of North Macedonia'.
 Saudi Arabia allows women to drive.
 China's National People's Congress votes to abolish presidential term limits, allowing Xi Jinping to rule for life. Xi is also the General Secretary of the Chinese Communist Party, the highest position without term limits.
 China–United States trade war begins.
 2018 Armenian revolution occurs.
 First post-ISIS election in Iraq.
 Death and state funeral of George H. W. Bush
 France wins the 2018 FIFA World Cup in Russia.
 Leaders from more than 40 international organizations and dignitaries from nearly 200 countries attends the centennial of the ending of the First World War.
 Bill Cosby found guilty of drugging and sexually assaulting a woman and is sentenced to three to ten years in prison.
 The Trump administration reimposes sanctions against Iran. 
 The first monkeys are cloned, and first genetically modified humans reported, in China.
 Jacob Zuma resigns as President of South Africa; Cyril Ramaphosa becomes President. 
 Scott Morrison becomes Prime Minister of Australia.
 Four people are poisoned, one to death, in Salisbury and Amesbury, England in a suspected Russian assassination attempt. The British government responds by leading the international expulsion of 153 Russian diplomats.
 The northern white rhinoceros becomes functionally extinct.
 The university professor Giuseppe Conte becomes Prime Minister of Italy at the head of a populist coalition.
 Ángela Ponce becomes the first openly transgender woman to represent Spain in the Miss Universe 2018.

2019
 January 3: Chang'e 4 becomes the first object to land on the far side of the Moon.
 January 25: Establishment of the Bangsamoro Autonomous Region in Muslim Mindanao.
 January – June: A series of suicide bombings occurred in Sulu.
 April 10: 
 The Event Horizon Telescope takes the first ever image of a black hole, at the core of galaxy Messier 87.
 Fossil fragments found in the Callao Cave in the Philippines reveal the existence of the Homo luzonensis species of humans.
 April 15: A major fire engulfs Notre-Dame Cathedral in Paris, resulting in the roof and main spire collapsing.
 April 30: Emperor Akihito of Japan abdicates from his throne, the first abdication by a Japanese monarch in almost two centuries. The abdication ends the Heisei era of Japan and ushers in the Reiwa era with new emperor Naruhito ascending the throne on May 1.
 May 13: The administration-led Hugpong ng Pagbabago wins 12 seats in the 2019 Philippine Senate election, defeating the opposition coalition Otso Diretso for the first time since the 1938 elections, that the opposition failed to garner a single seat in a legislative election.
 August 5: India revokes the special status of Jammu and Kashmir.
 August 20: The June 1993 rape and murder case of Eileen Sarmenta and Allan Gomez is reopened due to the controversial impending release of former Calauan mayor Antonio Sanchez.
 September 18: PMA Cadet 4th class Darwin Dormitorio was killed as a result of hazing inside the campus at the hands of his fellow cadets.
 September 19: An outbreak of polio is declared in the Philippines, 19 years following its eradication in the country.
 October 18: NASA astronauts Jessica Meir and Christina Koch conduct the first all-female spacewalk outside of the ISS.
 November 30 – December 11: The Philippines becomes the over-all champion in the 30th Southeast Asian Games.
 December 15: A 6.9 magnitude earthquake in Davao del Sur, kills 13 people.
 December 18: U.S. President Donald Trump is impeached by the House of Representatives for abuse of power and obstruction of Congress.
 December 19: The Ampatuan brothers and 26 co-accused are convicted for the Maguindanao massacre case.
 December 24: 20 people are killed and thousands are left homeless by Typhoon Phanfone in the Philippines.
 New Horizons takes the first close up image of a classical kuiper belt object.
 Christchurch mosque shootings kill 51 people, while a suicide bombing in Iran kills 41, and a series of bomb attacks in Sri Lanka kills 250.
 The Islamic State of Iraq and the Levant loses the last of its territory.
 Abdelaziz Bouteflika resigns as President of Algeria, while Omar al-Bashir is deposed as President of Sudan in a coup d'état amid widespread protests in both countries.
 Victor Vescovo breaks the human depth record, reaching 10,928 m in the Challenger Deep.
 Protests begin in Hong Kong over an extradition bill.
 Wildfires spike in Brazil, while Australia endures the most widespread brush fires in its history.
 Avengers: Endgame was released in theaters, breaking many box-office records, including becoming the highest-grossing movies of all time.
 Isabelle Holdaway is the first patient to receive a genetically modified phage therapy to treat a drug-resistant infection.
 Pope Francis abolishes pontifical secrecy in sex abuse cases.
 The 2019–2020 dengue fever epidemic begins in Southeast Asia.
 Jair Bolsonaro becomes President of Brazil.
 Protests erupt in Bolivia and Venezuela over disputed elections.
 Nursultan Nazarbayev resigns as President of Kazakhstan. Kassym-Jomart Tokayev assumes power. Astana is renamed Nur-Sultan in his honor.
 The EU Directive on Copyright in the Digital Single Market is passed over intense opposition.
 Volodymyr Zelenskyy becomes President of Ukraine.
 Bashar al Assad launches multiple offensives in Northwestern Syria; Turkey launches an offensive into northeastern Syria.
 More than a hundred people are killed after police and Janjaweed attack protesters in Sudan.
 The United States blames attacks on ships in the Gulf of Oman on Iran, escalating tensions in the Persian Gulf.
 Kyriakos Mitsotakis becomes Prime Minister of Greece.
 Boris Johnson becomes Prime Minister of the United Kingdom, and attempts a prorogation of Parliament that is ultimately declared unlawful.
 Barisha raid ends in the death of Abu Bakr al-Baghdadi.
 A 6.4 magnitude earthquake in Albania, kills 51 people.
 Greta Thunberg delivers "How dare you" speech at the 2019 UN Climate Action Summit.
 The U.S. Justice Department charges Chinese tech firm Huawei with multiple counts of fraud.
 WikiLeaks co-founder Julian Assange is arrested in London.
 More than 50 prisoners are killed in a series of riots in Amazonas, Brazil.
 A trilateral gathering was held at the Panmunjom Truce Village between South Korean President Moon Jae-in, North Korean Leader Kim Jong-un and United States President Donald Trump.
 Ursula von der Leyen becomes President of the European Commission.
 Joaquín "El Chapo" Guzmán found guilty of drug trafficking, money laundering and murder and is sentenced to 30 years in prison.
 Japan and South Korea trade dispute.
 Sahar Khodayari dies after setting herself on fire after being arrested for attending a soccer game in Iran.
 Twelve Catalan independence movement leaders found guilty of sedition and misuse of public funds and they were sentenced to 9 to 13 years in prison.
 Israeli Prime Minister Benjamin Netanyahu is indicted on charges of bribery, fraud and breach of trust.
 Sanna Marin becomes Prime Minister of Finland.
 Establishment of the Miss Universe Philippines by beauty pageant titleholder and pageant director Shamcey Supsup-Lee.
 Filipina Actress Kathryn Bernardo has made history in Philippine cinema after two of her movies each made more than ₱800 million in the box office.

2020s

2020
 January 3: Qasem Soleimani is targeted and killed at Baghdad International Airport.
 January 8: Ukraine International Airlines Flight 752 is shot down by Iranian Islamic Revolutionary Guards Corps (IRGC) shortly after taking off from Tehran, killing all 176 on board.
 January 16 – February 5: Donald Trump is acquitted by the United States Senate in his first impeachment trial.
 January 26: A helicopter crash in Calabasas, California kills nine people, including basketball star Kobe Bryant and his 13-year-old daughter Gianna.
 January 31: The United Kingdom formally withdraws from the European Union.
 February 9: Bong Joon-ho's Parasite becomes the first South Korean film to receive Academy Award recognitions at the 92nd Academy Awards.
 February 11: The 2020 New Hampshire primaries are held.
 February 13: The McClatchy newspaper chain files for Chapter 11 bankruptcy.
 May: 
 Cyclone Amphan becomes the costliest cyclone ever recorded in the Northern Indian Ocean.
 Protests in Belarus against the Alexander Lukashenko regime begin.
 May 8: The Trump Death Clock website unveiled a companion billboard in Times Square. The Trump Death Clock is based on the claim that had measures been implemented one week earlier, 60% of American COVID-19 deaths would have been avoided.
 May 25: The murder of George Floyd sparks protests across the United States and the world.
 May 30: Crewed spaceflight resumes in the United States for the first time since 2011.
 June 16: North Korea demolishes the Inter-Korean Liaison Office in Kaesong, established in 2018 to improve relations.
 June 19: 300 Filipinos who were living in Macau were airlifted in an operation headed by the Philippine Consulate General of the territory.
 June 30: China's National People's Congress grants itself sweeping powers to curtail civil liberties in Hong Kong.
 July 2: The FBI arrests British socialite Ghislaine Maxwell, an associate of late disgraced U.S. financier Jeffrey Epstein, in New Hampshire.
 July 9: Protests begin in Bulgaria against the government of Boyko Borisov.
 July 10: Turkey's President Recep Tayyip Erdoğan orders the Hagia Sophia in Istanbul to be reverted to a mosque following a supreme court annulment of a 1934 presidential decree that made it into a museum.
 July 15: The Twitter accounts of prominent political figures, CEOs, and celebrities are hacked to promote a bitcoin scam.
 July 28: Former Prime Minister of Malaysia Najib Razak is found guilty of all seven charges in the first of five trials on the 1MDB scandal, being jailed 12 years and fined RM210 million as a result.
 July 30: NASA successfully launches its Mars 2020 rover mission to search for signs of ancient life and collect samples for return to Earth.
 August 1: The Barakah nuclear power plant in the UAE becomes operational following delays since 2017.
 August 4: An explosion caused by unsafely stored ammonium nitrate kills at least 218 people, injures thousands, and severely damages the port in Beirut, Lebanon.
 August 19: The Special Tribunal for Lebanon convicts in absentia Salim Ayyash, a senior member of Hezbollah, for the 2005 assassination of former Prime Minister Rafic Hariri.
 August 25: Africa is declared free of wild polio, the second virus to be eradicated from the continent since smallpox 40 years previously.
 August 26: Amazon CEO Jeff Bezos becomes the first person in history to have a net worth exceeding US$200 billion, according to Forbes.
 August 28: Black Panther actor Chadwick Boseman dies at the age of 43, after privately battling with colon cancer for 4 years.
 September 3: The skeletons of 200 mammoths and 30 other animals are unearthed at a construction site for the Mexico City Santa Lucía Airport.
 September 4: 
 Pope Benedict XVI becomes the longest-lived pope at 93 years, four months, and 16 days, surpassing Pope Leo XIII, who died in 1903.
 The La Línea highway tunnel, the longest road tunnel in South America at a length of 8.65 kilometres (5.37 mi), is opened in Colombia after 14 years of construction and several delays.
 September 14: 
 The Royal Astronomical Society announces the detection of phosphine in Venus' atmosphere, which is known to be a strong predictor for the presence of microbial life.
 The first discovery of the perfectly preserved remains of a cave bear, believed to be 22,000 to 39,500 years old (Late Pleistocene), is made in Lyakhovsky Islands, Siberia in the thawing permafrost.
 September 16: 
 A United Nations Human Rights Council fact-finding mission formally accuses the Venezuelan government of crimes against humanity, including cases of killings, torture, violence against political opposition and disappearances since 2014.
 Yoshihide Suga becomes the Prime Minister of Japan, replacing Shinzo Abe.
 September 17: France, Germany, and the United Kingdom issue a joint note verbale to the United Nations rejecting China's claims to the South China Sea.
 September 27 – November 10: 2020 Nagorno-Karabakh war between Armenia and Azerbaijan.
 October 11: The Los Angeles Lakers defeat the Miami Heat in the 2020 NBA Finals to win their 17th championship in franchise history.
 October 15: 
 48 apartments could replace single family home in Downtown L.A.
 Hotel-Residential project at Wilshire takes another step forward, which will be completed in 2023. There are 14 residences in affordable units.
 President of Kyrgyzstan Sooronbay Jeenbekov resigns from office after weeks of massive protests in the wake of the October 2020 parliamentary election.
 October 20: NASA's OSIRIS-REx spacecraft briefly touches down on Bennu, becoming the agency's first probe to retrieve samples from an asteroid, with its cargo due for return to Earth in 2023.
 October 22: The Geneva Consensus Declaration on Promoting Women's Health and Strengthening the Family is signed by government representatives from 34 countries.
 October 23: At the end of an 11-year demining process, the Falkland Islands are declared free of land mines, 38 years after the end of the 1982 war.
 October 27: The Los Angeles Dodgers defeat the Tampa Bay Rays to win the 2020 World Series, their first in 32 years.
 October 29: The International Organization for Migration (IOM) confirms the death of least 140 migrants who drowned off the coast of Senegal on a vessel bound for the Spanish Canary Islands.
 November 3: The 2020 United States presidential election occurs. Despite the pandemic, early voting and other factors result in the highest voter turnout since 1900, and a record of over 155 million votes cast. Although Joe Biden is declared the winner on November 7, Donald Trump leads an unprecedented effort to prevent official recognition of his defeat, culminating on January 6 the next year.
 November 3: The Tigray War begins in Ethiopia.
 November 10: Apple releases the first Mac computers (a new MacBook Air, Mac mini and MacBook Pro) powered by Apple silicon chips.
 November 15: The Regional Comprehensive Economic Partnership (RCEP) is signed by 15 Asia-Pacific countries to form the world's largest free-trade bloc, covering a third of the world's population.
 November 19: 
 The Brereton Report into Australian war crimes during the War in Afghanistan is released.
 Shuggie Bain by Douglas Stuart wins the 2020 Booker Prize.
 November 27: Iran's top nuclear scientist, Mohsen Fakhrizadeh, is assassinated near Tehran.
 November 28: Mike Tyson returns to boxing in an exhibition bout against Roy Jones Jr.
 November 30: 
 A penumbral lunar eclipse occurs; the last of four lunar eclipses in 2020.
 Protein folding, one of the biggest mysteries in biology, is solved by AlphaFold, an artificial intelligence algorithm developed by DeepMind.
 December 1: The Arecibo Telescope of the Arecibo Observatory collapses, just weeks after the announcement of its planned demolition.
 December 2: 
 Three activists in Hong Kong were jailed for their roles in the 2019–20 Hong Kong protests, with Joshua Wong getting the heaviest at 13.5 months.
 The United Nations Commission on Narcotic Drugs votes to remove cannabis from a list of dangerous drugs in recognition of its medical value, although some controls will remain.
 December 8: Nepal and China officially agree on Mount Everest's actual height, which is 8,848.86m.
 December 18: Media outlets report that astronomers have detected a radio signal, BLC1, apparently from  the direction of Proxima Centauri, the closest star to the Sun.
 December 21: A great conjunction of Jupiter and Saturn occurs, with the two planets separated in the sky by 0.1 degrees. This is the closest conjunction between the two planets since 1623.
 The COVID-19 pandemic, which began spreading late in the prior year, spreads from China to the vast majority of the world's inhabited areas, infecting at least 81 million and killing at least 1.8 million people in its first year.
 Fears of COVID-19 cause the Dow Jones Industrial Average to fall ten percent in one week, its largest drop in history, triggering the COVID-19 Recession, the worst economic crisis since the Great Depression.
 The United States signs a tentative peace agreement with the Taliban.
 Silurian millipede Kampecaris obanensis, the oldest known land animal, is discovered in Scotland.
 China and India engage in border skirmishes, the largest escalation between the two powers in 50 years.
 China launches Chang'e 5 and becomes the third country after the United States and the Soviet Union to return samples of the moon.

2021
 January 1: The African Continental Free Trade Area comes into effect.
 January 3: The Washington Post publishes an audio recording of President Donald Trump urging Georgia Secretary of State Brad Raffensperger to change the state's 2020 presidential election results in his favor.
 January 4: The border between Qatar and Saudi Arabia reopens.
 January 6: Supporters of President Donald Trump, gathered after a rally led by him, attack the United States capitol, leading to five deaths.
 January 10: Kim Jong-un is elected as the General Secretary of the ruling Workers' Party of Korea, inheriting the title from his father Kim Jong-il, who died in 2011.
 January 13: In Lyon, France, the first transplant of both arms and shoulders is performed on an Icelandic patient at the Édouard Herriot Hospital.
 January 13 – February 13: Donald Trump is impeached for a second time following the events of January 6, though he is acquitted again after his trial from February 9–13.
 January 15: Wikipedia's 20th anniversary was noted in the media.
 January 20: Joe Biden is inaugurated as President of the United States. Kamala Harris, sworn in as vice president, becomes the first woman, first African American and first Asian American to be vice president.
 January 22: The Treaty on the Prohibition of Nuclear Weapons, the first legally binding international agreement comprehensively to prohibit nuclear weapons, comes into effect.
 February 5: SOMOS Community Care opened up Yankee Stadium as a COVID-19 vaccination "mega-site" operated by the SOMOS and the New York National Guard. Former Yankees Mariano Rivera participated in the opening of the site.
 February 10: Citi Field is converted into a COVID-19 vaccination "mega-site" operated by the City of New York.
 February 13 – 17: Winter Storm Uri becomes the costliest winter storm in North American history, costing $200 billion and 237 lives, and triggering the 2021 Texas power crisis.
 February 18: NASA's Mars 2020 mission (containing the Perseverance rover and Ingenuity helicopter drone) lands on Mars at Jezero Crater, after seven months of travel.
 February 22: Luca Attanasio, the Italian Ambassador to the Democratic Republic of the Congo, is murdered near Goma.
 March 6: Pope Francis meets with Grand Ayatollah Ali al-Sistani in Najaf, Iraq. It is the first-ever meeting between a pope and a grand ayatollah.
 March 18: Spanish Congress of Deputies passes the euthanasia law.
 March 19: North Korea severs diplomatic ties with Malaysia due to a Malaysian court's ruling that a North Korean citizen could be extradited to the United States to face money-laundering charges.
 March 20: Turkish President Recep Tayyip Erdoğan announces his country's withdrawal from the Istanbul Convention, the first country to do so.
 March 21: Clashes in Apure between Colombian FARC dissidents and the Venezuelan Armed Forces cause at least six casualties, as well as displacing 4,000 Venezuelans.
 March 23 – 29: The container ship Ever Given obstructs the Suez Canal for six days, costing an estimated $3.6 billion in global trade.
 April 9: Buckingham Palace announces the death of Prince Philip, Duke of Edinburgh and husband of the Queen, at the age of 99.
 April 11: Hideki Matsuyama wins the 2021 Masters Tournament, becoming the first man from Japan to win a major golf championship.
 April 13: Japan's government approves the dumping of radioactive water of the Fukushima Daiichi Nuclear Power Plant into the Pacific Ocean over the course of 30 years, with full support of the International Atomic Energy Agency.
 April 15: Scientists announce they successfully injected human stem cells into the embryos of monkeys, creating chimera-embryos.
 April 19: 
 Ingenuity becomes the first vehicle to fly in the atmosphere of another planet.
 Miguel Díaz-Canel becomes First Secretary of the Communist Party of Cuba, replacing the Castro brothers, Fidel and Raúl, after 62 years.
 April 20: 
 Idriss Déby, President of Chad, is killed in clashes with rebel forces after 30 years in office.
 Derek Chauvin is found guilty on all counts and sentenced to 22.5 years in prison for the murder of George Floyd in Minneapolis in May 2020.
 April 22: World leaders mark Earth Day by hosting a virtual summit on climate change, during which more ambitious targets for greenhouse gas emission reductions are proposed, including a 40% cut by 2030 for the United States.
 April 24: Following an international search and rescue effort, the Indonesian navy reports the sinking of KRI Nanggala with 53 crew members, the largest loss of life aboard a submarine since 2003.
 April 28 – May 1: A border clash between Kyrgyzstan and Tajikistan leads to 55 deaths.
 May 6 – 21: Hundreds die in conflicts after Israel evicts six Palestinian families from East Jerusalem.
 May 23: Ryanair Flight 4978 is forced to land by Belarusian authorities to detain dissident journalist Roman Protasevich.
 June 7: The Juno spacecraft performs its only flyby of Jupiter's moon Ganymede, the first flyby of the moon by any spacecraft in over 20 years.
 June 9: The Legislative Assembly of El Salvador passes legislation to adopt Bitcoin as legal tender in the country, becoming the first country to adopt the cryptocurrency alongside the U.S. dollar.
 June 13: Benjamin Netanyahu, the longest-serving prime minister of Israel, is voted out of office; Naftali Bennett and Yair Lapid are sworn in as Prime Minister of Israel and as Alternate Prime Minister of Israel, respectively.
 June 19: Joe Biden signed Juneteenth National Independence Day Act into law, that made Juneteenth a federal holiday. Since then, it is first new federal holiday since Martin Luther King Jr. Day.
 June 24: The Champlain Towers South apartment in Surfside, Florida, suddenly collapsed, resulted 98 people dead and 97 missing.
 June 30: Disgraced entertainer Bill Cosby is prematurely released from prison when the Pennsylvania Supreme Court overturns his sexual assault convictions and sentences on the grounds that his due prcoess rights were violated.
 July 7: Haitian President Jovenel Moïse, is assassinated in a midnight attack by unknown mercenaries.
 July 11: Thousands of Cubans, most of them young, attend a rare anti-government protest in San Antonio de los Baños to protest the increased food and medicine shortages brought on by the COVID-19 pandemic.
 July 18: An international investigation reveals that spyware sold by Israel's NSO Group to different governments is being used to target heads of state, along with thousands of activists, journalists and dissidents around the world.
 July 19: Blue Origin successfully conducts its first human test flight, with a reusable New Shepard rocket delivering four crew members into space including its founder Jeff Bezos.
 July 28: 
 Pedro Castillo is inaugurated as President of Peru.
 The first direct observation of light from behind a black hole is reported, confirming Einstein's theory of general relativity.
 August 4: Belarusian sprinter Krystsina Tsimanouskaya is given political asylum in Poland through a humanitarian visa after attempts by the Belarus Olympic Committee to repatriate her against her will.
 August 9: The Intergovernmental Panel on Climate Change releases the first part of its Sixth Assessment Report, which concludes that the effects of human-caused climate change are now "widespread, rapid, and intensifying".
 August 14: An earthquake in Haiti kills over 2,000 people.
 August 15: Kabul falls following the 2021 Taliban offensive, as the Islamic Republic of Afghanistan collapses de facto, and the country is governed thereafter by the Taliban as the reinstated Islamic Emirate of Afghanistan. The War in Afghanistan thus ends after 20 years following the withdrawal of U.S. and coalition troops.
 August 30: The UN Environment Programme announces that leaded petrol in road vehicles has been phased out globally, a hundred years after its introduction.
 September 7: El Salvador becomes the first country in the world to accept Bitcoin as an official currency.
 September 13: Prime Minister Ismail Sabri Yaakob and Anwar Ibrahim, the leader of the main Malaysian opposition coalition Pakatan Harapan, sign a confidence and supply agreement ending the 18-month political crisis that has led to the fall of two successive governments in Malaysia.
 September 14: North Korea demonstrates two short-range ballistic missiles that land just outside Japan's territorial waters; and then only hours later South Korea demonstrates its first submarine-launched ballistic missile.
 September 15: A trilateral security pact between Australia, the United Kingdom, and the United States is formed, to counter the influence of China. This includes enabling Australia to build its first nuclear-powered submarine fleet.
 September 16: Inspiration4, launched by SpaceX, becomes the first all-civilian spaceflight, carrying a four-person crew on a three-day orbit of the Earth.
 September 17: Premiere of Netflix's Squid Game.
 October 3: The International Consortium of Investigative Journalists and assorted media partners publish a set of 11.9 million documents leaked from 14 financial services companies known as the Pandora Papers, revealing offshore financial activities that involve multiple current and former world leaders.
 October 4: Fumio Kishida becomes the 100th Prime Minister of Japan, succeeding Yoshihide Suga.
 October 6: The World Health Organization endorses the first malaria vaccine.
 October 23: Colombia's most wanted drug lord, Dario Antonio Úsuga, whose Gulf Clan controls many smuggling routes into the US and other countries, is captured by Colombia's armed forces.
 November 11: SpaceX launches the Crew-3 mission, carrying four Expedition 66 crew members to the International Space Station.
 November 16: Russia draws international condemnation following an anti-satellite weapon test that creates a cloud of space debris, threatening the International Space Station.
 November 30: Barbados becomes a republic on its 55th anniversary of independence while remaining a member of the Commonwealth of Nations.
 December 9: A truck crash in Chiapas, Mexico, kills 55 migrants who were being smuggled in it from Guatemala through Mexico to its border with the United States.
 December 16–18: Typhoon Rai lashes into Philippines.
 December 19: Gabriel Boric is elected as President of Chile.
 The COVID-19 pandemic continues, infecting more than 220 million and killing at least 3.6 million people in its second year. The true totals of infected and dead are estimated to be much higher.
 Coups d'état occur in Myanmar, Mali and Guinea.
 Russia begins a military buildup on the Ukrainian border, warning NATO not to intervene.
 197 nations sign the Glasgow Climate Pact, agreeing to limit the use of coal, and the Netherlands legally mandates Royal Dutch Shell to comply with the Paris Agreement.
 Magdalena Andersson becomes Prime Minister of Sweden. 
 Barbadian singer Rihanna becomes the National Hero of Barbados.

2022
Monkeypox outbreak
Coups d'état in Burkina Faso
Pakistani constitutional crisis and attempted assassination of Imran Khan
Sri Lankan protests
United Kingdom government crises
Mahsa Amini protests
Argentina wins the 2022 FIFA World Cup. 
January: Bloody January in Kazakhstan
 January 4: China, France, Russia, the United Kingdom and the United States—all five permanent members of the United Nations Security Council—issue a rare joint statement affirming that "a nuclear war cannot be won and must never be fought."
January 15: The Hunga Tonga–Hunga Haʻapai eruption and tsunami is the largest and most powerful volcanic eruption in decades, and the largest explosion ever recorded by modern instruments.
 February 4–20: The 2022 Winter Olympics are held in Beijing, China, making it the first city ever to host both the Summer Olympics and Winter Olympics.
February 24: Russia invades Ukraine, escalating the Russo-Ukrainian War, causing a refugee crisis and tens of thousands of deaths on both sides.
March: WHL0137-LS "Earendel" imaged by Hubble Space Telescope, the earliest and most distant known star
March: 1915 Çanakkale Bridge opens
April: Elon Musk purchases Twitter
April 19: Kane Tanaka, the second oldest verified person to have ever lived, dies aged 119.
May: Sagittarius A*, supermassive black hole at Galactic Center, imaged by Event Horizon Telescope
June: Earthquake in Afghanistan
June: Dobbs v. Jackson Women's Health Organization
June – August: Heat waves in Europe kill tens of thousands.
July 8: Assassination of Shinzo Abe.
July: Chinese paddlefish declared extinct
July: James Webb Space Telescope takes Webb's First Deep Field, oldest and highest resolution image of the universe to date
August: UN Human Rights Office report on Xinjiang
August: Floods in Pakistan
August: Oder environmental disaster
August: "Man of the Hole", reclusive indigenous Brazilian and last of his ethnicity, dies
September 8: Elizabeth II dies, aged 96, and is succeeded by her son Charles III.
September 26: The Double Asteroid Redirection Test probe successfully crashes into the asteroid (65803) Didymos I Dimorphos.
September: Eliud Kipchoge sets marathon world record at Berlin
November 15: The world population is estimated to have reached 8 billion.
November: Ethiopia–Tigray peace agreement
November: COVID-19 protests in China
December: Qatar corruption scandal at the European Parliament
December: Self-coup attempt, impeachment and arrest of Pedro Castillo sparks protests in Peru
December: National Ignition Facility achieves first fusion ignition
 The COVID-19 pandemic infects at least 360 million and kills at least 1.3 million in its third year. The deployment of vaccines worldwide continues from the previous year, and the pandemic does not dominate headlines or the course of the year's events to the same extent it did for the previous two years.

2023

See also 
 Timeline of the 20th century
 Timelines of the future

References